Molit can refer to:
 Ministry of Land, Infrastructure and Transport (Korea)
 Mormon literature